Bianca Jolie Fernandez (born 24 February 2004) is a Canadian tennis player.

Fernandez has a career-high WTA singles ranking of 693, achieved on 30 January 2023. She also has a career-high WTA doubles ranking of 428 achieved on 13 February 2023.

Having previously played an exhibition doubles match with the Bryan Brothers, Fernandez made her WTA Tour main-draw debut at the 2022 Monterrey Open in the doubles draw, partnering with her sister, Leylah Fernandez. They lost in the first round to Elixane Lechemia and Ingrid Neel.

ITF finals

Doubles: 3 (3 runner-ups)

References

External links
 
 

2004 births
Living people
Canadian female tennis players
Canadian sportspeople of Filipino descent
Canadian people of Ecuadorian descent
Sportspeople of Ecuadorian descent